Kusatsu is a Hiroden station on Hiroden Miyajima Line, located in Kusatsu-higashi, Nishi-ku, Hiroshima.

Routes
From Kusatsu Station, there is one Hiroden streetcar route.
 Hiroshima Station - Hiroden-miyajima-guchi Route

Connections
█ Miyajima Line

Furue — Kusatsu — Kusatsu-minami

History
Opened as "Kusatsu-machi" on August 22, 1922.

Nearby station
Hiroshima SME University - Organization for Small & Medium Enterprises and Regional Innovation, JAPAN

See also
Hiroden Streetcar Lines and Routes

References

Kusatsu Station
Railway stations in Japan opened in 1922